Trail Life USA (TLUSA or commonly Trail Life) is a faith-based non-aligned Scouting organization providing youth mentorship and character development to more than 40,000 boys in the United States. The organization was founded in 2013 in response to changes in the membership policy of the Boy Scouts of America (BSA) to allow the participation of openly gay leadership. All charters of Trail Life USA must pledge to follow a "Statement of Faith"; the organization is Trinitarian and Christian. However, youths of all or no religious beliefs are allowed to join, but individual Charter Organizations may limit Troop membership to boys of a certain faith or membership in a certain organization.

Background

In May 2013, Boy Scouts of America (BSA) voted to change its membership policy to allow youth of any sexual orientation. Following the vote, John Stemberger changed the mission of OnMyHonor.net to start a new alternative Scouting program to be the premier national character development organization for young men which produces godly and responsible husbands, fathers, and citizens. OnMyHonor.net was a group formed by John Stemberger to oppose the proposed membership policy change in March 2013 and consisted of parents, Scoutmasters, Eagle Scouts and other Scouting leaders.

Following the vote, the Faith Based Boys (FBB) was founded. In May 2013, American Heritage Girls (AHG) joined the FBB. FBB official Thomas Dillingham indicated that the group would start accepting applications in August for youth memberships and group leaders.

OnMyHonor.net, Faith Based Boys and other regional and national groups, TrailHead USA and Frontier Service Corps, joined together to form the new group. A leadership meeting was held in Louisville, Kentucky on June 29, 2013 to discuss forming a new group. The AHG cofounder Patti Garibay was invited to the Kentucky meeting as an advisor. The organization would be based on the AHG program.

In a July 2013 interview,  Stemberger said the new group would be open to both gay boys and gay adults, but he stated "we’re going to focus on sexual purity not sexual orientation".  They will have a policy that "the proper context for sexual relations is only between a man and a woman in the covenant of marriage" and will not allow gay youth to "flaunt" their sexuality.

History

Trail Life USA was formed in July 2013. On September 6–7, 2013, a national convention was held for the new group where chartering rules, programs, rankings, and uniforms were adopted and its name revealed. Over 300 names were considered for the new organization.  The group selected Trail Life USA as its name and chose to start in January 2014 with an expected 1000 incubation troops formed by then. It was also revealed in September that Trail Life would be partnering with American Heritage Girls. During the national convention announcing Trail Life USA, Stemberger told the audience "Real men value truth over tradition," and "Real men value principle over program, and they value integrity over institutions."

In October 2013, Lutheran Church–Missouri Synod leaders indicated that member churches may affiliate with any Scouting program including Trail Life.

Richard Mathews, BSA's former general counsel, joined Trail Life USA as its acting general counsel.

Trail Life USA reported that almost 500 troops were pre-chartered by the January 1, 2014 official launch date. After its first full year of operation, Trail Life USA had 524 officially chartered troops in 48 states and just under 20,000 members.

Trail Life USA's headquarters (known as the "Home Office") is located on a 127-acre dedicated camping facility known as Camp Aiken, south of Greenville, South Carolina. The property features a full gymnasium, chapel, trails, fishing ponds, bonfire areas, and numerous campsites.

Program

Trailmen fall into various categories based on the grade they are in corresponding to their age:

 Woodlands Trails, grades K–5 (elementary school)
 Navigators, grades 6–8 (middle school)
 Adventurers, grades 9–12 (high school)
 Guidons, age 18 through 25 years

The Trail Life salute is based on the Military salute while its sign is a five finger sign similar to the three finger Scout sign. Trail Life USA's highest award is the Freedom Award for which the potential recipients must choose a "major" and two "minor" subjects and lead the development and implementation of a community-oriented Servant Leadership Project. The Freedom Award is characterized by Biblical symbolism from the Old and New Testaments of the Christian Bible, primarily John 8:36 referring to a Christian’s Freedom.

References

External links
 

Non-aligned Scouting organizations in the United States
Camping in the United States
Hiking organizations in the United States
Organizations established in 2013
2013 establishments in South Carolina
Christian non-aligned Scouting organizations